PF-9 may refer to:

, a frigate of the Philippine Navy
Kel-Tec PF-9, a 9 mm handgun
, a Tacoma-class frigate of the United States Navy